Chicano Park is a 32,000 square meter (7.9 acre) park located beneath the San Diego-Coronado Bridge in Barrio Logan, a predominantly Chicano or Mexican American and Mexican-migrant community in central San Diego, California. The park is home to the country's largest collection of outdoor murals, as well as various sculptures, earthworks, and an architectural piece dedicated to the cultural heritage of the community. The overall flavor of the art is Mexican irredentist and revolutionary.  Because of the magnitude and historical significance of the murals, the park was designated an official historic site by the San Diego Historical Site Board in 1980, and its murals were officially recognized as public art by the San Diego Public Advisory Board in 1987. The park was listed on the National Register of Historic Places in 2013 owing to its association with the Chicano Movement, and was designated a National Historic Landmark in 2016. Chicano Park, like Berkeley's People's Park, was the result of a militant (but nonviolent) people's land takeover. Every year on April 22 (or the nearest Saturday), the community celebrates the anniversary of the park's takeover with a celebration called Chicano Park Day.

Background 
The area was originally known as the East End, but was renamed Logan Heights in 1905. The first Mexican settlers there arrived in the 1890s, followed soon after by refugees fleeing the violence of the Mexican Revolution, which began in 1910. So many Mexican immigrants and Mexican-Americans settled there that the southern portion of Logan Heights eventually became known as Barrio Logan.

The original neighborhood reached all the way to San Diego Bay, with waterfront access for the residents. This access was denied beginning with World War II, when Naval installations blocked local access to the beach. The denial of beachfront access was the initial source of the community's resentment of the government and its agencies.

This resentment grew in the 1950s, when the area was rezoned as mixed residential and industrial. Junk dealers and repair shops moved into the barrio, creating air pollution, loud noise, and aesthetic conditions unsuitable for a residential area. Resentment continued to grow as the barrio was cleaved in two by Interstate 5 in 1963 and was further divided in 1969 by the elevated onramps of the San Diego-Coronado Bridge.

At this time, Mexicans were accustomed to not being included in discussions concerning their communities and to not being represented by their officials, so no formal complaint was lodged. This attitude began to change as the Civil Rights Movement unfolded in parallel with park development efforts. As various community campaigns coalesced under the banner of the Chicano Movement (for the right to organize and collectively bargain, led by César Chávez and Dolores Huerta of the United Farm Workers, the rights to the full benefits guaranteed to veterans, led by Dr. Hector P. Garcia of the American G.I. Forum, the right to equal and pertinent education, led by the student group MEChA which issued the Plan de Santa Barbara, for the rights of Mexicans guaranteed under the Treaty of Guadalupe Hidalgo, (especially land grants and bilingual education) under Reies Tijerina, and for recognition of the historic contributions of Mexican-Americans and the validity of Mexican culture) so too did the political awareness and sense of empowerment grow in Barrio Logan.

Community residents had long been demanding a park. The City Council had promised to build a park to compensate for the loss of over 5,000 homes and businesses removed for the construction of the freeway and bridge, as well as for the aesthetic degradation created by the overhead freeways supported by a forest of gray concrete piers. In June 1969, the park was officially approved and a site was designated, but no action was taken to implement the decision.

The takeover 
The final straw came on April 22, 1970. On his way to school, a community member, San Diego City College student, and Brown Beret member named Mario Solis noticed bulldozers next to the area designated for the park. When he inquired about the nature of the work being undertaken, he was shocked to discover that, rather than a park, the crew was preparing to build a parking lot next to a building that would be converted into a California Highway Patrol station.

Solis went door-to-door to spread the news of the construction. At school, he alerted the students of Professor Gil Robledo's Chicano studies class, who printed fliers to bring more attention to the affair. At noon that day, Mexican-American high school students walked out of their classes to join other neighbors who had already congregated at the site. Some protesters formed human chains around the bulldozers, while others planted trees, flowers, and cactus. Solis is reported to have commandeered a bulldozer to flatten the land for planting. Also, notably, the flag of Aztlán was raised on an old telephone pole, marking a symbolic "reclamation" of land that was once Mexico by people of Mexican descent.

There were many young people and families at the protest. When the crowd grew to 250, construction was called off. The occupation of Chicano Park lasted for twelve days while community members and city officials held meetings to negotiate the creation of a park. During that time, groups of people came from Los Angeles and Santa Barbara to join the occupation and express solidarity. The Chicano Park Steering Committee was founded by Josephine Talamantez, Victor Ochoa, Jose Gomez, and others. Not trusting the city and fearing that abandoning the land would be tantamount to conceding defeat, an agreement was finally reached and the Steering Committee called for an end to the occupation of the land while stationing informal picketers on the public sidewalks around the disputed terrain to provide residents with information regarding the project. They maintained that the park would be re-occupied if negotiations failed.

At a meeting on April 23, a young artist named Salvador Torres, recently returned to the barrio from the College of Arts and Crafts in Oakland, shared his vision of adorning the freeway support pillars with beautiful artworks and a green belt with trees and other vegetation that would stretch all the way to the waterfront. For this reason, he is sometimes referred to as "the architect of the dream." Finally, on July 1, 1970, $21,814.96 was allocated for the development of a 1.8 acre (7,300 m²) parcel of land.

Park establishment 
While the creation of the park was actually begun on the day of the takeover, with minor landscaping improvements being undertaken by the occupiers, the murals that brought the park to prominence were not begun until 1973. Adding unplanned murals and splashes of color did start in 1970, however, with Guillermo Aranda, Mario Acevedo, Victor Ochoa, Tomas Castaneda and others working on the freeway retaining walls and pylons. With few exceptions, the artists and their organizations raised the money necessary to purchase muriatic acid to wash the columns, rubber surface conditioner to prepare them, and paints. Victor Ochoa, a founding member of the Chicano Park Steering Committee, recalls that on March 23, 1973, he brought 300 brushes and there were nearly 300 people helping to paint all weekend. The Centro Cultural de la Raza in San Diego's Balboa Park served as a training area for many of the muralists. Many non-Chicanos also participated including Anglo artist, Michael Schnorr. Eventually a core of about 16 artists were dedicated to finishing the murals with many well-known Chicano artists and groups participating, such as members of the Royal Chicano Air Force. Over time, more vegetation was planted to create a cactus garden.

The first group of murals took nearly two years to complete. The murals at Chicano Park act as a way to transmit the history and culture of Mexican-Americans and Chicanos. Murals have many themes including addressing immigration, feminist concerns and featuring historical and civil rights leaders.

In 1978, there was a "Mural Marathon" which took place from April 1 through April 22. During those twenty-one days, approximately 10,000 square feet of murals were painted.

Other additions to the park have been piecemeal, as the comprehensive "Master Plan" put forth by the artists was never adopted by the city. The park has expanded, and currently reaches almost "all the way to the bay", a phrase used as the rally cry to extend the park in a 1980 campaign. The Cesar E. Chávez Waterfront Park was begun in 1987 and completed in 1990, finally restoring beach access to the community. With the exception of three city blocks that are not part of the park, the original goal of creating a community park with waterfront access has been achieved.

On Saturday, April 24, 2010, there was a 40th Anniversary Celebration held at Chicano Park with the theme being: "40 Años de la Tierra Mia: Aquí Estamos y No Nos Vamos."

An 80-foot-wide community sign for the park was planned to go up by 2014.

In 2014, the park had lights installed so that it would be well-lit at night-time, to create a more family-friendly atmosphere.

Landmark and historical status 
Because of the magnitude and historical significance of the murals, the park was designated an official historic site by the San Diego Historical Site Board in 1980, and its murals were officially recognized as public art by the San Diego Public Advisory Board in 1987. Josephine Talamantez and Manny Galaviz submitted the proposal that successfully added Chicano Park to the National Register of Historic Places in 2013 due to its association with the Chicano Movement.

In 1997, Josephine Talamantez began the process of placing Chicano Park with its artwork and murals on the National Register in order to prevent the city of San Diego from damaging the murals while retrofitting Coronado Bridge. After years of work, Chicano Park was officially designated as a National Historic Landmark in December 2016. Talamantez helped lead the opening of Chicano Park Museum and Cultural Center inside a nearby city-owned building that used to house the Cesar Chavez Continuing Education Center.  The Chicano Park Museum opened in October 2022.

Mural restoration 
Mural restoration projects began in 1984, and the murals have been restored almost continuously ever since. A large-scale restoration project took place in 2012 with many of the original artists returning to work on the art. The murals were fully restored by 2013 in time for the 43rd Anniversary Celebration.

Controversy 
Since its inception, there have been disputes within the community about who decides who gets to paint the murals, what imagery should be represented, who is responsible for the restoration of the murals, etc. But conflicts between the community artists and city and state officials have been much greater. Conflicts have also arisen between supporters and opponents of the park on political grounds.  There have also been a number of protests against the park by those who perceive many of the murals and the overall environment of the park as being anti-American, anti-law-enforcement and brown racialist. 
A few months after the park takeover in 1970, three Brown Berets, who helped lead it, were indicted and ultimately convicted of plotting to bomb the education building at City College.  The charges were criminal syndicalism, distributing bombs and one was charged with soliciting murder.  One of them, David Rico, remained a member of the Chicano Park Steering Committee and president of the Brown Berets de Aztlan until his death in 2022.
In 1979, a San Diego grand jury investigation forced the Chicano Federation and the Chicano Park Steering Committee to vacate the building next to the park due to financial and other abuses uncovered during the investigation.  The grand jury also recommended that the Chicano Federation be separated from the Chicano Park Steering Committee due to undue influence being exercised by the Steering Committee members on the Federation.
A demand for a kiosk, called the Chicano Park kiosko and based on traditional community centers in Mexican villages, was fulfilled in 1977, but only after a great deal of bureaucratic wrangling and disputes over the style of architecture to be used. Councilman Jess Haro wanted the architecture to be in the Spanish style, while the barrio residents wanted an indigenous style of architecture. The community won out, and today the kiosko resembles a Mayan temple.
An effort to have the barrio re-zoned as solely residential provoked the ire of the neighborhood junk dealers, who vandalized the murals, especially the "Barrio Sí, Yonkes No" mural created to commemorate the effort. 
In the mid-1990s, Caltrans decided to retrofit the San Diego-Coronado Bay Bridge to make it earthquake safe. Fearing that the murals would be damaged or destroyed, the community mobilized to stop the project to protect the murals from what they viewed as official insensitivity to the history and culture the murals represented. Eventually, a compromise was reached whereby the murals would be boarded over with plywood to protect their surfaces from damage during the retrofitting process, and would be restored to their previous condition afterward.
 A 2003 plan to renovate the park was stalled when Caltrans objected to the word "Aztlán", which for years had been spelled out in rocks on the park's grounds. Calling the term "militant", they claimed that using federal funding for the project would violate Title VI of the Civil Rights Act of 1964 by showing preference to Mexicans and Mexican Americans. However, Caltrans district director Pedro Orso, after consultations with civil rights experts from within the agency and from the Federal Highway Administration, decided that the word did not violate the law, and the $600,000 grant was allowed to go through.
 Chicano Park was added to the list of National Historic Landmarks by Obama's Secretary of the Interior, Sally Jewell on December 23, 2016.
 Conservatives have objected to murals depicting or referring to communist and socialist leaders such as Fidel Castro, Che Guevara, and Salvador Allende.
 On September 3, 2017, Blogger, Roger Ogden, a critic of the park organized a "Patriot Picnic" at the park for a group of five persons to discuss among themselves the "anti-American" features of some murals. Over 500 attended the counter-demonstration to prevent the private group from accessing the park. Ogden and his small group were eventually escorted out by dozens of police for their own safety, due to the threat from the angry mob of park supporters.
 On the morning of February 3, 2018, a second "Patriot Picnic" was organized by an anonymous group, calling itself "Bordertown Patriots", with the intention of flying the U.S. flag in the center of the park. Ogden was again involved, as were a number of "patriot" figures such as Joey Gibson. Hundreds of people came to again prevent the group from entering the park via the threat of mob violence. Two of the "patriots" were arrested, one for possession of an alleged "billy club" and another was cited for public urination in the free speech zone, where the group was confined by the police for hours due to the threat of violence from the surrounding park supporters with no restroom facilities. Police also arrested Frederick Burnett Jefferson, who was subsequently convicted of felony assault on a badly-injured police officer, as well as two felony counts and one misdemeanor count of resisting arrest Jefferson was sentenced to seven years in prison on August 31, 2018.  That same night he was found dead in his jail cell. An investigation has been completed. He committed suicide by hanging. While in jail he had also been implicated via DNA in a rape in Maryland and faced another trial.

Anniversary days 
Every year around April 22, Chicano Park marks an anniversary celebration to "celebrate the takeover of the area." The Park hosts traditional music as well as modern bands. Ballet folklorico, lowrider car exhibits and art workshops have also been a part of these celebrations.
 40th Anniversary Theme: 40 Años de the Tierra Mia: Aquí Estamos y No Nos Vamos
 43rd Anniversary Theme: Chicano Park: Aztlan's Jewel & National Chicano Treasure
 44th Anniversary Theme: La Tierra Es De Quien La Trabaja: The Land Belongs To Those Who Work It...

Park use 
The park hosts many different events and groups throughout the year. Different groups who practice and perform Aztec dance use Chicano Park to prepare for ceremonies and other events.

Quotes 
"The takeover of that land underneath the bridge in the barrio, that was a political expression. That was an expression of the community saying, 'Hey, we're not going to take it anymore. We're going to decide what's going to happen with this land.' And out of that political expression came cultural expression."—Veronica Enrique

"The community spirit and pent-up energy exploded in free, uncomposed murals of bright color."—Victor Ochoa

Gallery

See also
 List of parks in San Diego
 Carmen Linares-Kalo

Notes

References
Brookman, Philip, and Gómez-Peña, Guillermo, editors. Made in Aztlan. 1986. San Diego: Tolteca Publications, Centro Cultural de la Raza. 
Mulford, Marilyn, director. Chicano Park [videorecording]. 1988. United States: Redbird Films.

External links

The website of the Chicano Park Steering Committee, with a map and history
The site of San Diego State University's documentation project on the park, with photos of many of the murals
Under the Bridge - Documentary film on Chicano Park
An independent community site about Chicano Park, with fora
Mural, sculpture, and statue data and photographs, Public Art in Public Places
Mural photographs by Carlo Terlizzi Photography
Victor Ochoa talks about the murals (video)
Original Document for the National Register of Historic Places Registration Form
Brochure from Chicano Park
Chicano Park, award winning 1988 documentary about the park, directed by Marilyn Mulford

Chicano
Mexican-American culture in San Diego
Mexican-American history
California culture
DIY culture
Municipal parks in California
Open-air museums in California
Urban public parks
Parks in San Diego
National Register of Historic Places in San Diego
National Historic Landmarks in California